The 2017–18 NCAA Division I women's basketball season began on November 10, 2017 and ended with the Final Four title game at Nationwide Arena in Columbus, Ohio on April 1, 2018. Practices officially began in September 29, 2017.

Season headlines

Milestones and records
 November 13 and 16 – Chastadie Barrs of Lamar recorded triple-doubles in consecutive games, making her the eighth Division I women's player to do so. First, she recorded 14 points, 10 assists, and 10 steals in a 93–62 win over Division III Louisiana College. Barrs fell one rebound short of a quadruple-double in this game. She then recorded 24 points, 10 rebounds, and 11 steals in the Cardinals' 92–49 blowout of NAIA school Southwestern Assemblies of God.
 November 13 and 17 – On the night after Barrs recorded her second straight triple-double, Sabrina Ionescu of Oregon matched the feat, becoming the ninth Division I women's player to do so. In the preseason WNIT, Ionescu recorded 29 points, 10 rebounds and 11 assists in Oregon's quarterfinal against Drake, followed by 16 points, 11 assists and 10 rebounds against Texas A&M in the semifinals. This gave the sophomore six triple-doubles in her career, one shy of what was then the Division I women's record of seven.
 November 25 – Kelsey Mitchell of Ohio State became the all-time Division I women's leader in made three-pointers. Mitchell's seven three-pointers in the Buckeyes' 104–62 romp over Florida Gulf Coast gave her 402 for her career, surpassing the previous record of 398 by Connecticut's Kaleena Mosqueda-Lewis.
 December 17 – Ionescu recorded her seventh career triple-double, tying the NCAA women's all-divisions record then held by Suzie McConnell-Serio (Penn State) and Louella Tomlinson (Saint Mary's). She had 21 points, 11 rebounds, and 14 assists in the Ducks' 90–46 blowout of Ole Miss.
 December 19 – Two coaches recorded their 1,000th career wins. First, North Carolina's Sylvia Hatchell reached the milestone when the Tar Heels defeated Grambling State 79–63. Later in the evening, Geno Auriemma reached the milestone when UConn defeated Oklahoma 88–64. Auriemma became the fastest coach in either men's or women's Division I history to reach 1,000 wins, doing so in his 33rd season and 1,135th game.
 December 31 – Ionescu took sole possession of the record for career triple-doubles with 24 points, 14 rebounds, and 10 assists in the Ducks'  94–83 win over Washington. This game was also the 500th career win for Ducks head coach Kelly Graves.
 January 3 – Grambling State's Shakyla Hill became the first player in Division I basketball to record a quadruple-double since Lester Hudson in 2007, and the first to do so in D-I women's play since 1993. She had 15 points, 10 rebounds, 10 assists, and 10 steals in the Lady Tigers' 93–71 win over Alabama State.
 January 7 – Mercer's KeKe Calloway hit 12 three-pointers in the Bears' 86–64 win at Furman, tying a Division I women's single-game record.
 January 13 – Mitchell became the 13th Division I women's player with 3,000 career points, reaching the milestone with her first two points in the Buckeyes' 77–62 win at Indiana.
 January 27 – Mitchell became the all-time scoring leader in the Big Ten Conference, surpassing Rachel Banham of Minnesota during the Buckeyes' 78–62 win over Michigan State.
 February 1 – Chattanooga's Jim Foster became the eighth NCAA women's coach and the seventh in Division I with 900 career wins, reaching the mark with a 58–41 win over Western Carolina.
 February 3 – In a more ignominious milestone, Chicago State set a new Division I women's record with its 59th consecutive loss, reaching the mark with a 59–43 home loss to Grand Canyon.
 February 17 – Oregon's Ruthy Hebard set a new Division I women's record for consecutive field goals made, going 12-for-12 in the Ducks' 80–74 double-overtime win over USC to finish the game with an ongoing streak of 30. The previous record of 28 was set in 1998 by Southern Utah's Myndee Kay Larsen.
 February 19 – Hebard made her first three basket attempts in Oregon's 101–94 overtime win over UCLA, ending with a streak of 33 consecutive field goals, the NCAA Division I record for a player of either sex. She had entered the game even with Yale's Brandon Sherrod, who had a streak of 30 in 2016.
 March 16 – Ionescu recorded her sixth triple-double of the season in Oregon's 88–45 first-round NCAA tournament win over Seattle with 19 points, 10 rebounds, and 11 assists. This matched the single-season Division I triple-double record, previously accomplished by Danielle Carson of Youngstown State in 1985–86, and also in men's play by BYU's Kyle Collinsworth in both 2014–15 and 2015–16. It was also the 16th triple-double in Division I women's tournament history, and the first since Iowa's Samantha Logic in 2015.
 March 17 – UConn crushed Saint Francis (PA) 140–52 in the first round of the NCAA tournament, setting a new scoring record for a Division I women's tournament game. The only team to score more points in a Division I tournament game was the Loyola Marymount men, who scored 149 in a 1990 game against Michigan.

Conference membership changes
Three schools joined new conferences for the 2017–18 season.

In addition to the schools changing conferences, the 2017–18 season was the last for four schools in their then-current conferences:
 North Dakota left the Big Sky Conference for the Summit League.
 Hampton and USC Upstate respectively left the Mid-Eastern Athletic Conference and Atlantic Sun Conference (ASUN) to become members of the Big South Conference.
 Liberty left the Big South to join the ASUN.

Arenas

New arenas 
 DePaul played its first season at Wintrust Arena, which replaced McGrath–Phillips Arena (though the DePaul women's volleyball team continues to use the older venue).
 NJIT played its first season at the Wellness and Events Center, replacing Fleisher Center.
 UMBC began the season at the Retriever Activities Center, the team's home since 1973, but the school opened the new UMBC Event Center in February 2018. The new facility opened on February 3 with the UMBC men hosting Vermont; the women's first game there was on February 8 against Binghamton.
 Wofford played its first season at Jerry Richardson Indoor Stadium, replacing Benjamin Johnson Arena.

Arenas closing 
 Elon played its final season at Alumni Gym, which opened in 1950 for the Elon men's team and had housed the women's team since its first season of 1971–72. The school opened the new Schar Center, with more than three times the capacity of Alumni Gym, for the 2018 women's volleyball season (which precedes the basketball season).

Temporary arenas 
Four Division I women's teams played the 2017–18 season in temporary homes due to renovation of their current venues. A fifth played in a temporary home following the demolition of its previous venue to accommodate a new arena.
 Cincinnati, which normally plays at the on-campus Fifth Third Arena, played most of its home games at the gymnasium of nearby Catholic girls' school St. Ursula Academy, also taking some games to the nearby campus of local community college Cincinnati State College.
 Houston renovated Hofheinz Pavilion, which was renamed Fertitta Center upon its reopening. The renovated venue was expected to open by the start of the 2018–19 season, but construction delays pushed back the reopening to December 2018. The Cougars played at Texas Southern's Health and Physical Education Arena, and continued to play there until Fertitta Center reopened.
 Northwestern played at Beardsley Gym on the campus of Evanston Township High School while Welsh–Ryan Arena was being renovated.
 Robert Morris closed the Charles L. Sewall Center, home to the Colonials since 1985, in June 2017. The UPMC Events Center, under construction at the Sewall Center site, was scheduled to open in the middle of the 2018–19 basketball season. Until that time, the Colonials played home games at the Student Recreation and Fitness Center, which opened in September 2017 at the university's North Athletic Complex as part of the UPMC Events Center project. (Later construction delays pushed back the opening of the UPMC Events Center to the 2019–20 season.)
 Villanova played at its former on-campus home of Jake Nevin Field House during renovations to its normal home of The Pavilion, which was renamed Finneran Pavilion when it reopened for 2018–19.

Preseason polls

 
The top 25 from the AP and USA Today Coaches Polls.

Regular season

Early preseason tournament

Tournament upsets
For this list, an "upset" is defined as a win by a team seeded 7 or more spots below its defeated opponent.

Conference winners and tournaments
Each of the 32 Division I athletic conferences ends its regular season with a single-elimination tournament. The team with the best regular-season record in each conference is given the number one seed in each tournament, with tiebreakers used as needed in the case of ties for the top seeding. The winners of these tournaments receive automatic invitations to the 2018 NCAA Division I women's basketball tournament.

Award winners

All-America teams

The NCAA has never recognized a consensus All-America team in women's basketball. This differs from the practice in men's basketball, in which the NCAA uses a combination of selections by the Associated Press (AP), the National Association of Basketball Coaches (NABC), the Sporting News, and the United States Basketball Writers Association (USBWA) to determine a consensus All-America team. The selection of a consensus team is possible because all four organizations select at least a first and second team, with only the USBWA not selecting a third team.
 
Of the major selectors in women's basketball, the AP and USBWA divide their selections into separate teams, but the 2017–18 season was the first in which the USBWA did so. The women's counterpart to the NABC, the Women's Basketball Coaches Association (WBCA), continues the USBWA's former practice of selecting a single 10-member (plus ties) team. The NCAA does not recognize Sporting News as an All-America selector in women's basketball.

Major player of the year awards
Wooden Award: A'ja Wilson, South Carolina
Naismith Award: A'ja Wilson, South Carolina
Associated Press Player of the Year: A'ja Wilson, South Carolina
Wade Trophy: A'ja Wilson, South Carolina
Ann Meyers Drysdale Women's Player of the Year (USBWA): A'ja Wilson, South Carolina
espnW National Player of the Year: A'ja Wilson, South Carolina

Major freshman of the year awards
USBWA National Freshman of the Year: Chennedy Carter, Texas A&M
 WBCA Freshman of the Year: Chennedy Carter, Texas A&M
 espnW Freshman of the Year: Chennedy Carter, Texas A&M

Major coach of the year awards
Associated Press Coach of the Year: Muffet McGraw, Notre Dame
Naismith College Coach of the Year: Vic Schaefer, Mississippi State
WBCA National Coach of the Year: Vic Schaefer, Mississippi State
 espnW Coach of the Year: Muffet McGraw, Notre Dame

Other major awards
Nancy Lieberman Award (top point guard): Sabrina Ionescu, Oregon
Ann Meyers Drysdale Award (top shooting guard; inaugural award): Victoria Vivians, Mississippi State
Cheryl Miller Award (top small forward; inaugural award): Gabby Williams, Connecticut
Katrina McClain Award (top power forward; inaugural award): Ruthy Hebard, Oregon
Lisa Leslie Award (top center; inaugural award): A'ja Wilson, South Carolina
 WBCA Defensive Player of the Year: Kia Nurse, Connecticut
 Naismith Women's Defensive Player of the Year (inaugural award): Teaira McCowan, Mississippi State
Senior CLASS Award: Gabby Williams, Connecticut
Maggie Dixon Award (top rookie head coach): Bart Brooks, Belmont
Academic All-American of the Year (top scholar-athlete): Cherise Beynon, New Mexico
Elite 90 Award (top GPA among upperclass players at Final Four): Jordan Danberry, Mississippi State
Pat Summitt Most Courageous Award: Avery Marz, Saint Joseph's player

Conference standings

Coaching changes
Several teams changed coaches during and after the season.

See also

2017–18 NCAA Division I men's basketball season

Footnotes

References